This is a list of lighthouses in Democratic Republic of the Congo.

Lighthouses

See also
List of lighthouses in the Republic of the Congo (to the north-west) 
List of lighthouses in Angola (to the north and south)
 Lists of lighthouses and lightvessels

References

External links

Congo Democratic Republic
Lighthouses
Lighthouses